Earl Willard Killian (August 3, 1920 – September 21, 2022) was an American college sports head coach and athletic director. He coached Towson University's men's soccer, men's basketball, and baseball teams. He was the first head coach of all three teams. 

As of November 2016, Killian was living in Daytona Beach, Florida, and he turned 100 in August 2020. He died on September 21, 2022, at the age of 102.

Head coaching record

Soccer

Basketball

Baseball

References

1920 births
2022 deaths
American centenarians
American soccer coaches
Baseball coaches from Maryland
Basketball coaches from Maryland
Men centenarians
Sportspeople from Daytona Beach, Florida
Towson Tigers athletic directors
Towson Tigers baseball coaches
Towson Tigers men's basketball coaches
Towson Tigers men's soccer coaches